Dørum is a surname. Notable people with the surname include:

Anneliese Dørum (1939–2000), Norwegian politician
Aslak Dørum (born 1964), Norwegian writer and bassist
Knut Dørum Lillebakk (born 1978)
Odd Einar Dørum (born 1943), Norwegian politician 
Reidar Dørum (1925–2014), Norwegian footballer